The Goes Wrong Show is a British comedy series created by Henry Lewis, Jonathan Sayer and Henry Shields, and produced by Mischief Screen and Big Talk Productions, in association with Lionsgate UK, for the BBC. The programme stars the ensemble members of the Mischief Theatre company, who reprise their roles as the members of the fictitious theatre company, "Cornley Polytechnic Drama Society", as they conduct a "live" televised stage play, which tends to go wrong due to mistakes, accidents and other issues that hamper the company's efforts. The concept was devised by Lewis, Sayer and Shields following two television Christmas specials for the BBC, with the series premiering on BBC One on 23 December 2019. In 2020, the group conducted a second series, but under strict guidelines due to the COVID-19 pandemic in the United Kingdom, which aired on 27 September 2021.

Premise
The plot for each episode of the programme focuses on the Cornley Polytechnic Drama Society having the opportunity to conduct a play on live television before a live studio audience. As with the stage performances conducted by Mischief Theatre as the fictional theatre company, all productions and events done by the Cornley group tend to go wrong due to issues with props and stage pieces, mistakes with lines, and problematic accidents; in some cases, the play goes wrong right from the start due to a mistake setting it up.

Cast 
 Henry Shields as Chris Bean - the company's pedantic, long-suffering director, who struggles to keep the play running smoothly.
 Henry Lewis as Robert Grove - an actor who believes acting is all about presence and volume. He constantly feuds with Chris over the lead role of performances.
 Jonathan Sayer as Dennis Tyde - an actor entrusted with small roles, including animals and inanimate objects, due to his inability to remember lines and his misinterpretation of stage directions and instructions.
 Dave Hearn as Max Bennett - an actor who is talented, but tends to be a ham when making an entrance or performing a stunt. 
 Charlie Russell as Sandra Wilkinson - an actress who tends to overact when performing and keenly seeks to impress her audience.
 Bryony Corrigan as Vanessa Wilcock-Wynn-Carroway - an actress who tends to suffer frequent accidents during performance and cannot cope with improvisation.
 Nancy Zamit as Annie Twilloil - a member of the company roped in against her will to be an actress, often being assigned to supporting roles that may not work so well.
 Chris Leask as Trevor Watson - the company's stage manager responsible for the scenery and props, who does his best to avoid being seen by the audience when fixing mistakes; although occasionally roped in as a supporting character when required.
 Greg Tannahill as Jonathan Harris - an actor who struggles when performing to be noticed, due to either being unable to open the doors on a set and thus sometimes getting trapped, or having his scenes messed up by mishaps and accidents.
 Ellie Morris as Lucy Grove - an actress who suffers from stage fright, anxiety and distress, mostly due to her uncle Robert's harsh training of her acting skills.

Production

Background 
In 2016, Mischief Theatre was offered the opportunity by the BBC to produce a televised adaptation of Peter Pan Goes Wrong, which aired in December 2016. The following year, the broadcaster invited the company back to produce a new special, titled A Christmas Carol Goes Wrong, in December 2017. Both specials proved a success with viewers, leading Mischief Theatre to be commissioned for a television series for BBC One. The company's directors, Shields and Sayer, opted to using the same writers and cast for the series, and devised the series as The Goes Wrong Show, focused on the fictional theatre company the cast performed as being involved in conducting different stage performances. The six episodes were each given different themes for their play, including a period romance and a spy thriller, and led to the production of six half-hour episodes. A second series was later commissioned, beginning with a Christmas special in 2020, followed by five episodes in 2021.

Development 
The Goes Wrong Show was announced by the BBC on 22 February 2019. The show was commissioned by BBC's controller of comedy commissioning, Shane Allen, and Charlotte Moore, director of BBC content. Following the success of the first series, the BBC commissioned a second series, which premiered on 22 December 2020. The first half-hour episode was a re-telling of the Nativity story.  In addition to the writers, the show also stars regular Mischief performers including Charlie Russell, Bryony Corrigan, Dave Hearn and Nancy Zamit. In one of the episodes, the cast are filmed upside down.  The first series was recorded in the dock10 studios in Salford, Greater Manchester.

Episodes

Series 1 (2019–2020)

Christmas Special (2020)

Series 2 (2021)

Reception
The first series received generally positive reviews. Radio Times''' Huw Fullerton said that "The Goes Wrong Show ... is actually the laugh-out-loud new project from the Mischief Theatre company". Tim Dowling from The Guardian praised the show's farce and the amount of behind-the-scenes effort that went into making it work. Another positive review for the opening episode came from Michael Hogan's review in The Telegraph. He said "This old-fashioned, family-friendly comedy trod the line between seasonal cheer and black humour with aplomb. It was like Mrs. Brown's Boys but funny."

When reviewing the Christmas episode, Steve Bennett from Chortle said "while every mistake here is, of course, meticulously planned, they are pulled off with enough flair, commitment and occasional ingenuity to break all but the most cynical of viewers to laughter." The show received a five-star review from Suzi Feay of the Financial Times, who said, "This stuff has to be directed and performed with pinpoint accuracy if it’s to succeed. Fortunately, it’s perfectly, deliberately, terrible.” In a negative review, Lottie Young of the Evening Standard called the first episode "embarrassingly bad" and argued that "the formula of slapstick comedy is more fossilised than old-fashioned." Rupert Hawksley from i News said that "theatre does not always translate well to television" and noted the script as being "dreadful".

 Watch-along 

On 3 April 2020, during the COVID-19 pandemic, Mischief Theatre began a watch-along of the episodes of the show on Twitter (with the hashtag #GoesWrongAlong), beginning with "90 Degrees". The watchalongs started at 7pm.

DVD release
The first series was released on DVD by Lionsgate Home Entertainment UK on 10 February 2020. DVDs of the two specials, Peter Pan Goes Wrong and A Christmas Carol Goes Wrong'', were released on 29 March 2021 and series two was made available, all again through Lionsgate Home Entertainment, from 20 December 2021.

Notes

References

External links
 

2019 British television series debuts
2021 British television series endings
2010s British comedy television series
2020s British comedy television series
BBC television comedy
English-language television shows
Mischief Theatre
Television series about actors
Television series by Big Talk Productions
Television series by Lionsgate Television